The Lee Valley Ice Centre is located in Leyton, in the Lower Lea Valley, London. Figure Skating, ice hockey
and public skating sessions are all available at the centre.

Redevelopment
There are plans to rebuild the centre, plans which would improve facilities but increase the footprint of the centre at the expense of public open space.

Public Skating 
Lee Valley Ice Centre has public skating year round, seven days a week. Disco sessions occur every Saturday at 20:30 and birthday parties can be booked for the morning and afternoon session on weekends.

Synchronised Skating 
There are currently five synchronised skating teams training at Lee Valley Ice Centre, adult (Orion), elementary (Stardust), juvenile (Supernova), preliminary (Phoenix), and mixed age (Aura).

Ice Hockey 
The Lee Valley Ice Centre is home to the Lee Valley Lions, an amateur side competing in the English National Ice Hockey League. It used to also be home to the London Racers, who competed in the top-level British Elite Ice Hockey League. The London Racers controversially withdrew from the British Elite Ice Hockey League after the club decided that the rink was not safe enough for "elite" level ice hockey. This was not backed up by any official report and was highly disputed by the park authority. It is thought the safety "problem" was used as a smokescreen to mask the team's financial problems. The Lee Valley Lions and the Junior programme continue to the current day.

Additional information 
The music video for Sugar Coated Iceberg by The Lightning Seeds, which featured on their 1996 album Dizzy Heights, was filmed inside Lee Valley Ice Centre.
Dancing On Ice rehearsals are also occasionally filmed inside Lee Valley Ice Centre.

References

External links 
Lee Valley Ice Centre
Lee Valley Park
Lee Valley Lions
London Racers
Lee Valley Synchronised Skating

Sports venues in London
Indoor ice hockey venues in England
Ice hockey in London